Femi Oluwole (born 17 March 1990) is a British political activist and co-founder of the pro-European Union advocacy group Our Future Our Choice (OFOC). He has appeared as an activist and commentator on British television. He has written for The Independent, The Guardian and The Metro.

Early life and education
Oluwole was born in Darlington to Nigerian parents – a surgeon father and a paediatrician mother, who both emigrated to the United Kingdom in the 1980s. He grew up in the West Midlands but as a child lived in several different places across the country, having once attended a school in Dundee. He was privately educated at the Yarm School, and went on to study law and the French language at the University of Nottingham, while completing an Erasmus Programme year in France.

Career
Oluwole has interned in non-governmental organisations (NGOs) and human rights agencies. At the age of 27 he left his traineeship and moved into his parents' loft to become a campaigner against Brexit, telling the Evening Standard that he made the decision to quit 2 months before his traineeship ended because he was "frustrated that the pro-Remain argument was not being made effectively by mainstream politicians." In pursuing this, Oluwole created the social media channel Our Future Our Choice in September 2017, which, with the collaboration of Will Dry and Lara Spirit, who had launched an anti-Brexit student activism movement in universities, was incorporated as a company on 19 February 2018. The group advocated a pro-EU message from a youth standpoint. He supported the People's Vote campaign for a further referendum on EU membership.

Oluwole regularly appeared in the media during the process of the United Kingdom's exit from the European Union. Oluwole has written for The Independent, The Guardian, and the Metro, and has appeared on Talkradio.

In July 2019, Richard Tice, chair of the Brexit Party, threatened to sue Oluwole after he alleged that Leave.EU (an organisation Tice co-founded) was "overtly antisemitic". Oluwole refused to apologise.

References

External links

1989 births
Living people
People educated at Yarm School
Alumni of the University of Nottingham
Alumni of the Erasmus Programme
British activists
English people of Nigerian descent
People from Darlington